Mehrdad Zafarzadeh (born 12 February 1962) is an Iranian former cyclist. He competed in the team time trial at the 1988 Summer Olympics.

References

1962 births
Living people
Iranian male cyclists
Olympic cyclists of Iran
Cyclists at the 1988 Summer Olympics
Place of birth missing (living people)
Cyclists at the 1986 Asian Games
Asian Games competitors for Iran
20th-century Iranian people